Sagittarius (Latin for "archer") is the ninth astrological sign, which is associated with the constellation Sagittarius and spans 240–270th degrees of the zodiac. Under the tropical zodiac, the sun transits this sign between approximately November 22 and December 21. Greek mythology associates Sagittarius with the centaur Chiron, who mentored Achilles, a Greek hero of the Trojan War, in archery.

Sagittarius, the half human and half horse, is the centaur of mythology, the learned healer whose higher intelligence forms a bridge between Earth and Heaven. Also known as the Archer, Sagittarius is represented by the symbol of a bow and arrow.

Astrology

Along with Aries and Leo, Sagittarius is a part of the Fire Trigon as well as the last of the reproductive trinity. It also follows Gemini and Virgo as third of the mutable signs, which are the signs that feature changeable quality. When Sagittarius is depicted as an archer, then he is classified as human but when represented as a centaur, he is nonhuman (bestial). However, the classification of the astrological sign as a human or bestial does not carry practical consequences for interpretation.

As an archer, Sagittarius is said never to fail in hitting the mark and this depiction alludes to the power of prophecy, hence, the claim that seers and prophets are born in this sign.

Cultural impression
It is the coat of arms of the Iranian city Isfahan.

Gallery

See also

Astronomical symbols
Chinese zodiac
Circle of stars
Cusp (astrology)
Elements of the zodiac

Inline citations

Works cited
 
  Longitude of Sun, apparent geocentric ecliptic of date, interpolated to find time of crossing 0°, 30°....

External links
 Warburg Institute Iconographic Database (over 300 medieval and early modern images of Sagittarius)

Western astrological signs
Centaurs
Fictional archers